The Shops at National Place was a three-level, indoor shopping mall located in downtown Washington, D.C. in the 16-story National Place Building.  It is located on the block bounded by Pennsylvania Avenue, F Street, between 13th and 14th Streets NW, the former site of the Munsey Trust Building.  It was located near the Metro Center station of the Washington Metro system.

, a small food court with nine vendors, branded "Eat at National Place", operates in a portion of the space, but the court closed in May 2020. A few retail shops face the street.

History
The Shops opened in two phases during 1984 and 1985.  It was designed as a central piece in revitalizing downtown Washington, D.C.'s traditional downtown shopping core along F Street, NW, west of the Woodward & Lothrop flagship.  The Shops replaced the former flagship stores of Raleigh's and Joseph R. Harris Co.

The first phase of 53 stores opened on May 14, 1984, and was developed by The Rouse Co.  The  retail complex was hailed as "part of a very important renaissance of downtown Washington." The Shops opened concurrently with a new 774-room JW Marriott Hotel (the first in that chain), and refurbished National Theater and National Press Building.
Melart Jewelers and Sight and Sound Electronics were part of the first phase located in the JW Marriott lobby.

The 40-store phase two of The Shops opened April 25, 1985.  It included August Max, Record Town, and Brooks Fashions among the original tenants. The complex featured a 15-story atrium for the refurbished National Press Building and 450 spaces of underground parking.  At the opening ceremony Mayor Marion Barry proclaimed "Downtown is coming alive . . .!" In 2008, due to many vacancies in the mall, the mall was closed, except for the food court, and the passageway to the JW Marriott. What will be done with the former mall is not known, it may be converted to office space, reopened, converted to a big-box store, or renovated and reopened.

References 

Shopping malls in Washington, D.C.
Shopping malls established in 1984
1984 establishments in Washington, D.C.
National Place